The Wombat Gyrocopters Wombat, sometimes called a Julian Wombat, is a British autogyro that was designed by Chris Julian and produced by Wombat Gyrocopters of St Columb, Cornwall, introduced in 1991. Now out of production, when it was available the aircraft was supplied as a kit for amateur construction.

Development
Julian was known as a motorcycle speedway racer. He decided to design his own autogyro and on 4 November 1991 the CAA issued the Wombat a restricted Permit to Test. It was test flown at the St Merryn airfield in Cornwall. In May 1997, when Julian was 60 years old, he was killed in the crash of a different model gyroglider at the Kemble airfield.

After Julian's death the Wombat design rights passed to former helicopter pilot Mark Harrisson in July 2000. Harrisson had intended to put the aircraft back into production, but in 2013 instead donated the prototype to The Helicopter Museum in Weston-super-Mare, where it arrived on 9 July 2013.

Design
The Wombat was designed to comply with the British Amateur-built aircraft rules. It features a single main rotor, a single-seat semi-enclosed cockpit with a cockpit fairing and windshield, tricycle landing gear, plus a tail caster and a twin cylinder, air-cooled, two-stroke, single-ignition  Rotax 532 engine in pusher configuration.

The aircraft fuselage is made from bolted-together aluminum tubing. Rotor cyclic control is via torque-tubes. The rudder is constructed with a composite skin over a foam core. The aircraft lacks a horizontal stabilizer.

Operational history
In April 2015 no examples were registered in the United Kingdom with the CAA. Although a total of four had been registered at one time, all have had their registrations cancelled by the CAA.

Aircraft on display
The Helicopter Museum, Weston-super-Mare - prototype Wombat G-WBAT

Specifications (Wombat)

See also
List of rotorcraft

References

External links
Photo of a Wombat
Photo of a Wombat in The Helicopter Museum, Weston-super-Mare
A flying 'Wombat' in the Stornoway Gazette, 2009

Wombat
1990s British sport aircraft
Homebuilt aircraft
Single-engined pusher autogyros
Aircraft first flown in 1991